Chiquito River is a river in the municipality of Ponce, Puerto Rico. It has its origin in the mountains west of Montes Llanos. Río Chiquito is fed by Quebrada del Pastillo. This river is one of the 14 rivers in the municipality of Ponce.

Origin

Course
Río Chiquito runs from south central barrio Montes Llanos into north central barrio Portugués dividing barrio Portugués lengthwise from north to south into essentially two equal halves. It crosses several times the east-to-west Camino La Cuchilla Road as it continues southward. After this, the river is found next to the western edge of PR-588, also known as Camino Río Chiquito, until PR-588 comes to its southern terminus where it meets PR-504. From this point onward Río Chiquito runs southward along the western edge of PR-504 for approximately  until it crosses PR-504 eastward.

The following table summarizes the course of Río Chiquito in terms of roads crossed. Roads are listed as the river flows from its origin in the mountains of Montes Llanos, north of the city of Ponce, to its feeding into Río Portugués in Barrio Portugués (N/A = Data not available):

Former and current course
For flood control purposes, Río Chiquito was diverted by the United States Army Corps of Engineers so that it would merge with Río Portugués about  further north from its original natural merge, this merging them in a less populated area that where they initially merged.

Former course
The former course of Río Chiquito, prior to being diverted by the US Army Corps of Engineers, followed from the area just east of PR-504, at N 18.04262 W 66.60911, and headed southeast crossing Avenida Federal (aka, Calle A), and continued southeast for some  after which it took a southerly turn before crossing today's PR-10 (PR-10 had not been built then). A few hundred feet after this Río Chiquito took its final turn, to the west, before it came to an end at its feeding into Río Portugués at N 18.03258 W 66.61397.

Current course
Once the US Army Corps of Engineers diverted its course of Río Chiquito, the last kilometer or so (about 0.7 mile) of the river disappeared, as Río Chiquito came to feed into Río Portugués some 0.5 km north of its initial feeding point.

At its mouth, Río Chiquito has an elevation of 98 feet.

The net effect of the change in the course of the river is that Río Chiquito now feeds into Río Portugués immediately north of PR-10, whereas prior to the change it fed into Río Portugués to the south of PR-10.

See also
 List of rivers of Puerto Rico
 List of rivers of Ponce

References

External links
 USGS Hydrologic Unit Map – Caribbean Region (1974)

Rivers of Puerto Rico
Rivers of Ponce, Puerto Rico
Barrio Montes Llanos